Philaethria pygmalion is a butterfly of the family Nymphalidae. It was described by Hans Fruhstorfer in 1912. It is found from eastern Colombia to central Brazil.

The larvae feed on Passiflora species P. coccinea, P. faroana, P. hexagonocarpa, P. mansoi and P. phaeocaula.

Subspecies
Philaethria pygmalion pygmalion (southern Colombia and Venezuela to central Brazil)
Philaethria pygmalion metaensis Constantino & Salazar 2010 (Colombia: Meta)

References

 "Philaethria pygmalion (Fruhstorfer, 1912)". Insecta.pro. Retrieved February 6, 2020.

Butterflies described in 1912
Heliconiini
Fauna of Brazil
Nymphalidae of South America